Hassan Vossug ed Dowleh (1 April 1868 – 3 February 1951) was twice Prime Minister of Iran. He was the older brother of Ahmad Qavam, who also served as Prime Minister.

Life
Hassan Vossug was born to one of Iran's most famous families. His father was Mirza Ebrahim Motamed os-Saltaneh, and his grandfather was Mohammad Qavam od-Dowleh.

Vossug's mother died when he was young, after which he was cared for by an uncle while his father worked as a financial manager in several provinces of Iran. He was educated at home by tutors and was fluent in French and English. As an adolescent, he accompanied his father on his travels, and took over the financial administration of Iranian Azerbaijan at a young age.

Vossug was elected as a founding member and deputy president of the inaugural National Consultative Assembly (Majles) of Iran in 1906. In the years 1911 to 1915, Vossug was the first Foreign Minister and later Minister of Finance. He served as Prime Minister from August 1916 to June 1917 and again from August 1918 to July 1920.

Vossug played a leading role in negotiations that resulted in the 1919 Anglo-Persian Agreement, which led to allegations that he had been bribed by the British. Although Vossug denied that he had enriched himself personally and also offered to repay the money, his reputation was so damaged that he left Iran.

Vossug returned to the country in June 1926, not long after the accession of the new king Reza Shah. He served briefly again as Minister of Finance and then as Minister of Justice. He resigned as minister to run for a seat in the Majles, to which he was elected. After the expiry of his term in 1928, Vossug withdrew from politics, though he was still frequently consulted by Reza Shah in financial matters. In 1936 he became a member of the newly founded Academy of Persian Language and Literature.

Hassam Vossug died in 1951 in Tehran.

See also
Qajar dynasty
List of prime ministers of Iran

References

Sources
'Alí Rizā Awsatí (عليرضا اوسطى), Iran in the Past Three Centuries (Irān dar Se Qarn-e Goz̲ashteh - ايران در سه قرن گذشته), Volumes 1 and 2 (Paktāb Publishing - انتشارات پاکتاب, Tehran, Iran, 2003).  (Vol. 1),  (Vol. 2).

1868 births
1951 deaths
Politicians  from Tehran
Prime Ministers of Iran
Politics of Qajar Iran
20th-century Iranian politicians
19th-century Iranian politicians
Democrat Party (Persia) politicians
Ministers of Justice of Iran
Mostowfian Ashtiani family
People of Qajar Iran
Burials in Qom